Chauncey Forward (February 4, 1793 – October 19, 1839) was an American politician who served as a Jacksonian member of the U.S. House of Representatives from Pennsylvania.

Early life and education
Forward was born in Old Granby, Connecticut, to Samuel and Susannah Forward. Among his brothers were Oliver Forward and Walter Forward. His grandson was Chauncey Forward Black.  He moved with his father to Ohio in 1800, and a short time afterward to Greensburg, Pennsylvania.  He pursued classical studies, studied law, was admitted to the bar in Pittsburgh, Pennsylvania, in 1817 and began practice in Somerset, Pennsylvania.  He was married to Rebekah Blair of Maryland.

Career
He was a member of the Pennsylvania House of Representatives from 1820 to 1822 and the Pennsylvania State Senate for the 22nd district from 1823 to 1826.

Forward was elected to the Nineteenth Congress to fill the vacancy caused by the resignation of Alexander Thomson.  He was reelected to the Twentieth Congress and reelected as a Jacksonian to the Twenty-first Congress.  He was appointed prothonotary and recorder of Somerset County, Pennsylvania, in 1831.  He died in Somerset in 1839 and was interred in Ankeny Square Cemetery.

Sources

The Political Graveyard

|-

|-

1793 births
1839 deaths
19th-century American politicians
Burials in Pennsylvania
Jacksonian members of the United States House of Representatives from Pennsylvania
Members of the Pennsylvania House of Representatives
Pennsylvania lawyers
Pennsylvania prothonotaries
Pennsylvania state senators
People from Granby, Connecticut
People from Somerset, Pennsylvania